Unione Calcio Sampdoria was once again condemned to midfield mediocrity, despite the services of super striker Enrico Chiesa, who netted 22 goals in just 27 appearances. Sven-Göran Eriksson continued with an attacking style of play, leading to Sampdoria scoring 59 goals in 34 matches, only bettered by champions Milan and Lazio. The backside was the many conceded goals it led to, with even relegated Torino having a better defensive record than the Genua team. Playmaker duo Clarence Seedorf and Christian Karembeu had great seasons, both compensating for the losses of Jugović, Lombardo and David Platt in the summer. The duo caught the attention of Real Madrid, and moved to Spain, with Karembeu staying put until the end of the 1996–97 season.

Players

Transfers

Competitions

Serie A

League table

Results by round

Matches

Coppa Italia

Second round

Round of 16

Statistics

Players statistics

Goalscorers
  Enrico Chiesa 22
  Roberto Mancini 11
  Filippo Maniero 6
  Christian Karembeu 5
  Siniša Mihajlović 4

References

U.C. Sampdoria seasons
Sampdoria